The Museum of Far Eastern Antiquities, located in Stockholm, Sweden, is a museum launched by Sweden's Parliament in 1926, with the Swedish archaeologist Johan Gunnar Andersson (1874–1960) as founding director. The museum is located on Skeppsholmen in the building Tyghuset and since 1999 the museum is a part of the public Swedish National Museums of World Culture.

Overview
The museum was originally based mainly on Andersson's groundbreaking discoveries in China, during the 1920s, of a hitherto unknown East Asian prehistory. The museum today has wide-ranging collections from Japan, Korea, India and China. It exhibits of both archeology, classical arts and contemporary culture, and holds a large research library open to the public. The last time the museum published a comprehensive catalog was 1963 (Museum of Far Eastern Antiquities: Album). The museum also publishes an annual journal focused on research on ancient East Asia, the Bulletin of the Museum of Far Eastern Antiquities.

Gallery

See also
Johan Gunnar Andersson
Bernhard Karlgren (the museum's second director)

References

External links

English-language website listing exhibitions
publications of the Museum at the Internet Archive, including volumes 1–40 of the Bulletin of the Museum of Far Eastern Antiquities

Asian art museums in Sweden
Museums in Stockholm
Archaeological museums in Sweden
Art museums and galleries in Stockholm
Art museums established in 1926
1926 establishments in Sweden